is a passenger railway station located in the city of Kōchi city, the capital of Kōchi Prefecture, Japan. It is operated by JR Shikoku and has the station number "K04".

Lines

Layout
The station, which is unstaffed, consists of a side platform serving a curved section of track. There is no station building or shelter. A road viaduct crosses the tracks over part of the platform, providing cover from weather.

Adjacent stations

History
The station opened on 1 November 1986 as  operated by Japanese National Railways (JNR). With the privatization of JNR on 1 April 1987, control passed to JR Shikoku and it was renamed Kōchi-Shōgyō-Mae Station.

Connections

Surrounding area
Kochi Municipal Kochi Commercial High School

See also
List of railway stations in Japan

References

External links

https://www.jr-shikoku.co.jp/01_trainbus/jikoku/pdf/kochi-shogyomae.pdf timestable] 

Railway stations in Kōchi Prefecture
Railway stations in Japan opened in 1986
Kōchi